The 1916 United States presidential election in Wyoming took place on November 7, 1916, as part of the 1916 United States presidential election. State voters chose three representatives, or electors, to the Electoral College, who voted for president and vice president.

In 1912, Wyoming had been the eighth-best state for embattled Republican nominee William Howard Taft. However, in contrast to the East where supporters of Theodore Roosevelt's "Bull Moose" Party rapidly returned to the Republicans, in the Mountain States many if not most of these supporters turned to the Democratic Party not only in presidential elections, but also in state and federal legislative ones. Another factor helping President Woodrow Wilson was a powerful "peace vote" in the Western states due to opposition to participation in World War I, and a third was that a considerable part of the substantial vote for Eugene Debs from the previous election was turned over to Wilson owing to such Progressive reforms as the Sixteenth and Seventeenth Amendments.

Consequently, Wilson was able not merely to hold Wyoming from 1912, but to increase his margin by over ten percentage points to carry the state by 12.76 percent. This is the third best Democratic performance in the history of presidential elections in Wyoming, behind Franklin Delano Roosevelt's landslide wins in 1932 and 1936. Wilson became the first Democratic presidential candidate to carry the counties of  Carbon, Converse, Lincoln, Natrona, Niobrara, and Washakie. , this election is the last time Wyoming has voted more Democratic than the nation at-large.

Results

Results by county

See also
 United States presidential elections in Wyoming

References

Wyoming
1916
1916 Wyoming elections